The Love + Dance World Tour is the ninth concert tour by Puerto Rican singer Luis Fonsi, in support of his worldwide hit single, "Despacito" (2017). The tour began on July 1, 2017, in Andújar, Spain, and concluded on July 26, 2018, in Marbella, Spain.

Background
Fonsi announced the tour after his performance of "Despacito" at Late Night with Conan O'Brien on June 12, 2017. The American leg of the tour will take Fonsi to major markets, including Los Angeles, Chicago, Atlanta and Las Vegas, with more cities and dates to be announced. The tour began on July 1 in Spain.

Opening acts
 Karol G

Set list
This set list is representative of the concert on July 1, 2017. It does not represent all concerts for the duration of the tour.

"Tanto Para Nada"
"Corazon En La Maleta"
"Nada Es Para Siempre" 
"Imaginame Sin Ti"
"Apaga la Luz"
"Gritar"
"Llegaste Tú"
"¿Quién Te Dijo Eso?"
"Por Una Mujer"
"Llueve Por Dentro"
"Échame la Culpa"
"Se Supone"
"Yo Te Propongo"
"Aún Te Amo" / "Que Quieres de Mí" / "Abrazar la Vida" / "Aunque Estes con Él" / "Respira"
"No Me Doy por Vencido"
"Aquí Estoy Yo"
"Despacito"

Tour dates

Cancelled shows

Notes

References

2017 concert tours
2018 concert tours